The Kent Rugby Football Union is the governing body for the sport of rugby union in the county of Kent in England. The union is the constituent body of the Rugby Football Union (RFU) for Kent, and administers and organises rugby union clubs and competitions in the county.  It also administers the Kent county rugby representative teams.

History 

One of the oldest unions in the country, the Kent Rugby Football Union was founded in 1880. In 1891, the Kent RFU created the Kent Cup as a county-wide competition for their members, one of the first few county cups established in England and the second in southern England after the Hampshire Rugby Football Union.  They have a rich history in the men's senior County Championship since the early years of the competition, finishing as one of the regional winners in 1892, and became outright winners for the first time in 1897.  They have gone on to win the top flight competition several more times, although the last time was way back in 1927.

In 2010, the Kent RFU were brought into national attention following an incident in a Kent Cup match between Maidstone and Gravesend where a Gravesend player was blinded in one eye as a result of eye-gouging. Despite a statement from the County Chairman that there would be a long ban for the perpetrator,  there were no charges from either the Kent RFU, The RFU or Kent Police due to lack of evidence available. As a result, instead, Maidstone were fined £2,000 and deducted 50 league points for failing to identify the player.

In modern times Kent have yo-yoed between Division 1 and Division 2 of the championships, with the most recent silverware claimed being the 2014 Plate when the defeated Durham 30–23 at Twickenham Stadium. They also run regular county tours overseas including to New Zealand in 2012 and to Argentina in 2016.

Kent senior men's county side

Kent senior men's county side currently play in the Bill Beaumont Division 1 South – the top level of the County Championships, having been promoted despite losing 33–27 to East Midlands in the 2016 Plate final.

Honours:
County Championship winners (3): 1897, 1904, 1927
County Championship Plate winners (2): 2010, 2014

Affiliated clubs
There are currently 56 clubs affiliated with the Kent RFU, most of which have teams at both senior and junior level.  The majority of clubs are based in Kent, but there are also clubs from south-east London and even East Sussex.

Ash
Ashford
Askeans
Aylesford Bulls
Badgers RFC
Beccehamian
Beckenham
Bexley
Blackheath
Brockleians
Bromley
Canterbury
Charlton Park
Cranbrook
Dartford Valley
Dartfordians
Deal & Betteshanger
Dover
Edenbridge
Erith
Faversham
Folkestone
Footscray
Gillingham Anchorians
Gravesend
Greenwich
Guy's Hospital
Hastings & Bexhill
HSBC
King's College Hospital
Lordswood
Maidstone
Medway
New Ash Green
Old Colfeians
Old Dunstonian
Old Elthamians
Old Gravesendians
Old Williamsonians
Orpington
Park House
Royal Bank of Scotland
Sevenoaks
Sheppey
Shooters Hill
Sidcup
Sittingbourne
Snowdown Colliery
Southwark Lancers
Thanet Wanderers
Tonbridge Juddians
Tunbridge Wells
Vigo
Weavering Warriors
Westcombe Park
Whitstable

County club competitions 

The Kent RFU currently runs the following competitions for club sides based in Kent and parts of south-east London, which they also administer discipline for:

Leagues
Shepherd Neame Kent 1 – a league ranked at tier 9 of English rugby union league system
Shepherd Neame Kent 2 – tier 10 league

Cups
Kent Cup – founded in 1970, for club sides at tiers 5–6 of the English rugby union system as well as 2nd teams for local clubs in higher divisions (tiers 3–4)
Kent Shield – founded in 2015, for club sides at tiers 7–8
Kent Vase – founded in 2001, for club sides at tiers 9–10
Kent Plate – founded in 1993, for club sides knocked out of the first round of the Kent Cup and Kent Shield
Kent Salver – founded in 2005, for club sides knocked out of the first round of the Kent Vase

Discontinued competitions

Kent 3 – tier 11 league, cancelled in 2008
Kent 4 – tier 12 league, cancelled in 2001

Notes

References

External links 
Kent RFU website

Rugby union governing bodies in England
Rugby union in Kent
Sports organizations established in 1880